Tybory-Kamianka  is a village in the administrative district of the Gmina Wysokie Mazowieckie, within Wysokie Mazowieckie County, Podlaskie Voivodeship, in north-eastern Poland.

The village has a population of 120.

Polish historian and archaeologist Zygmunt Gloger was born here.

References

Tybory-Kamianka